House of General Science or HoGS is a special interest house at Rochester Institute of Technology. HoGS was established in 1997 as a house devoted to the love of science, and is open to all majors.

History
The House of General Science was originally started by members of the Alpha Chi Sigma (ΑΧΣ) Chemistry Fraternity in Gibson Hall. However, they realized that devoting a single floor to chemistry was too narrow, and could easily attract more members by branching into all sciences.

Academics
The House of General Science was established to provide a scholastic network for its members, and prides itself on attracting more than just science majors. Some past and current members of the floor have been:

 Biological Sciences
 Physics
 Chemistry
 Mathematics
 Environmental Sciences
 Engineering
 Business
 Arts
 Imaging Science
 Computing Sciences, Medical Informatics, and related majors

House Representatives
The House of General Science has an executive board, and several committees devoted to making the environment in the house inviting to members.

E-Board
For the 2021-2022 year, the e-board includes:

 President: Victoria Greever
 Vice-President: Joseph Gysbers
 Secretary: Savannah Kidd
 Treasurer: Will Ebmeyer

Committees
The on-floor committees include:

 Public Relations
 Social Council
 Community Service
 Project Manager
 Academic Liaison
 Technical Support
 Historical Council
 Housing Improvement
The off-floor committees include:
 Off-floor Liaison

House Resources
House of General Science has many resources available on floor for its members to utilize, in both academic and recreational ways.

Academic
The house has a study lounge and library of both scholastic and recreational books to be on loan to any member of the house. The study lounge has two white boards and a number of tables at which to work, and many on-floor members who are more than willing to help tutor in difficult subjects. Additionally, the house has a Tech Lounge, which houses the floor's server for its website.

Recreational
The floor has a lounge exclusively for recreational use. Amenities include an arsenal of Nerf blasters, board games, couches, and large flat-screen HDTV. These items are used frequently for social events and bonding activities for the house. Social events occur about 5 times a week, and are planned by the HoGS social committee. If there is a cost for the event, HoGS will usually subsidize a portion of it. Past events include apple picking, rock climbing, laser tag, paintball, bocce, holiday parties, movie nights, and much much more. There are also regular Super Smash Bros. and Magic: The Gathering games.

References

External links
 Website: HoGS
 Website: RIT Housing Operations: Special Interest Housing & Lifestyle Floors
 Website: RIT Center for Residence Life: Special Interest Houses

Rochester Institute of Technology
University and college dormitories in the United States